Edward Wanshear Wynkoop (June 19, 1836 – September 11, 1891) was a US Army officer during the American Civil War and later an Indian agent. He was a founder of the city of Denver, Colorado. Wynkoop Street in Denver is named after him.

History

Edward Wanshaer Wynkoop was born on June 19, 1836, in Philadelphia, Philadelphia, the youngest of eight children. His father was John Wanshaer Wynkoop (1794-1837) and his mother was Angelina Catharine Estill (1803-1877). He was the great-grandson of Continental Congress member, Judge Henry Wynkoop. He had five sons and three daughters with Louise Brown Wakely between 1862 and 1878. His grandson was noted architect Francis W. Wynkoop.

Wynkoop was appointed the first Sheriff of Arapahoe County, Kansas Territory (entire NE quarter of present State of Colorado) on September 21, 1858.  

Wynkoop served as an officer in the First Colorado Volunteer Cavalry during the American Civil War, attaining the rank of major of volunteers, and was brevetted a lieutenant colonel in May 1865.  During a period as post commander at Fort Lyon, Colorado in 1864, Wynkoop encouraged peace efforts with the Cheyenne, but was transferred in November 1864 to Fort Riley, Kansas, where he was posted at the time of the Sand Creek massacre. Wynkoop was alerted to the massacre by his friend, Captain Silas Soule, who commanded Company D, 1st Colorado Cavalry, which was present at Sand Creek on November 29, 1864, when Soule refused an order to join the massacre. On behalf of the U.S. Army Wynkoop later investigated Col. John M. Chivington's conduct at Sand Creek, which led to Chivington's condemnation.

In 1866, Wynkoop became an Indian agent for the Southern Cheyennes and Arapaho, resigning in December 1868 in protest of the destruction of Black Kettle's village in the Battle of Washita River. He later became warden of the New Mexico penitentiary.

Edward lived with his wife and eight children in Santa Fe, New Mexico, between about 1885 and 1891, during which time he was Warden of the New Mexico Penitentiary.

Death
Wynkoop died on September 11, 1891 in Santa Fe, New Mexico, at the age of 55. He was buried there.

References

Notes

 Hardorff, Richard G., compiler & editor (2006). Washita Memories: Eyewitness Views of Custer's Attack on Black Kettle's Village. Norman, OK: University of Oklahoma Press. .

External links

 
Edward Wynkoop at Find a grave

1836 births
1868 deaths
History of Denver
People of Colorado in the American Civil War
Military personnel from Philadelphia
Union Army officers
United States Indian agents
American people of Dutch descent
People from Denver